The Škoda Slavia is a subcompact sedan (B-segment) manufactured by Škoda primarily for the Indian market. It was introduced in November 2021 and was produced since 2022. Built on the MQB A0 IN platform adapted for India, the vehicle is based on the Volkswagen Virtus sedan. The Slavia replaced the Volkswagen Polo-based Rapid.

Overview 
The Slavia was introduced on 18 November 2021. Compared to the preceding Rapid, the Slavia is  longer,  wider,  taller with a  longer wheelbase. It is built with a localisation level of 95 percent. At launch, the Slavia in India is offered in three trims, which are Active, Ambition and Style.

The Slavia is available with a choice of two turbocharged petrol engines. The entry-level option is a 1.0-litre three-cylinder TSI unit producing  and paired to either a 6-speed manual or a 6-speed torque converter automatic. The more powerful option, is a 1.5-litre four-cylinder TSI motor with  that gets either the 6-speed manual or a 7-speed DSG gearbox. The 1.5 TSI is also equipped with the cylinder deactivation technology.

In 2022, the Slavia contains 95% local parts.

Powertrain

Safety 
The Škoda Slavia is sold in India with a standard safety specification of two frontal airbags, i-Size approved ISOFIX anchorages, Electronic Stability Control, three-point seatbelts in all seats, front and rear seatbelt pretensioners, post-collision braking and a tyre pressure monitor. Higher trim levels are additionally equipped with side torso airbags and head-protecting curtains.

The Slavia has not been independently crash-tested by the Global New Car Assessment Programme (Global NCAP), but Škoda claims it has been engineered to meet the requirements of Global NCAP's revised 2022 assessment scheme, including offset frontal impact, side impact, pedestrian protection (including the Euro NCAP upper leg impactor, which is not tested by Global NCAP), and that the optional curtain airbags have been tested for head protection in a side pole impact.

References

External links 

 Official website

Slavia
Cars introduced in 2021
Front-wheel-drive vehicles
Subcompact cars
Sedans